Shimmer and Shine is an American animated television series created by Farnaz Esnaashari-Charmatz and produced by Nickelodeon Animation Studio. It premiered on Nickelodeon's Nick Jr. block on August 24, 2015, and ran for four seasons. The show is about two genies, Shimmer and Shine, who grant wishes for their human friend Leah.

On March 18, 2018, new episodes moved to the separate Nick Jr. Channel.

Plot
The first season is set in the human world and focuses on a young girl named Leah who is friends with a pair of twin genie sisters named Shimmer and Shine. Each day, the genies grant Leah three wishes, but they often make mistakes. Each episode features Leah working together with the genies to resolve the problems they unintentionally cause, all while keeping Shimmer and Shine a secret from her next door neighbor and best friend Zac.

In the second season, the characters are transported to Zahramay Falls, a magical land where Shimmer and Shine live. Leah reveals her genies' existence to Zac, who is given a genie of his own, named Kaz. Shimmer and Shine continue to grant Leah wishes in Zahramay Falls and befriend the sovereign of the land, Princess Samira. The season includes Samira's pet peacock, Roya and Leah's pet fox, Parisa. Also, Zeta, a villainous sorceress, and finally, Zeta's dragon, Nazboo.

Episodes

Characters

Humans and genies
Shimmer (voiced by Eva Bella in the US, and Mia Wiltshire in the UK) is an optimistic genie with blue eyes, green jewels, a purple genie outfit and hot pink ponytailed hair. She is enthusiastic and encouraging. She loves cleaning, glitter, and collecting genie bottles. Her pet is a gibbon monkey named Tala.
Shine (voiced by Isabella Cramp in the US, Elie Simons and Mia Hope in the UK) is a courageous genie with purple eyes, pink jewels, a teal genie outfit with yellow shoes and blue ponytailed hair. She is an animal lover and is often hungry. Her pet is a Bengal tiger cub named Nahal. Due to her love of animals, she is very knowledgeable about the behaviors of magical creatures native to Zahramay Falls. Unlike her sister, she hates cleaning. A running gag involves Shine saying "It's like I always say..." only to humorously reveal that she has just made up whatever she says next.
Leah (voiced by Alina Foley in the US, and Claudia Burns in the UK) is a yellow haired girl with green eyes who owns a genie bottle necklace on her pink shirt, which includes Shimmer and Shine. Although Shimmer and Shine usually mess up her wishes, Leah is patient and forgiving with them. Originally, she was forced to keep her genies' existence a secret from her close friend Zac, but revealed her secret to him after being transported to Zahramay Falls. In the second season, Princess Samira grants Leah and Zac's wish to visit Zahramay Falls whenever they want. While visiting her genies in Zahramay Falls, Leah magically dons a genie disguise in order to blend in, as humans are normally not allowed in Zahramay Falls.
Zac (voiced by Blake Bertrand in the first two seasons, Justin Felbinger, and later Ethan Jones in seasons three and four in the US, and Innis Robertson-Pinnel in the UK) is Leah's neighbor with red hair and blue eyes, and best human friend. In the first season, he is oblivious to the fact that Leah has genies. Whenever something strange or unusual happens, he responds to it in a carefree manner. He also has a habit of telling humorous experiences he has had to Leah. In the second season, he learns that Leah has genies and gets a genie of his own named Kaz.
Princess Samira (voiced by Nikki SooHoo in the US, and Cariad Lloyd in the UK) is the ruler of Zahramay Falls with violet eyes and ice blue hair with darker blue tips, who is in charge of checking up on all the genies in training. She can grant wishes along with the younger genies. She occasionally rewards genies with magic Genie Gems that can have a variety of magical effects. She acts as Shimmer and Shine's mentor and teacher. Despite Zeta being her self-proclaimed rival, Samira likes Zeta and is willing to give her a second chance at becoming a genie-in-training, which in season three is revealed to be due to her past friendship with Zeta when they were both students under Empress Caliana and hopes that Zeta and her can one day become friends again.
Zeta the Sorceress (voiced by Lacey Chabert in the US and the UK) is a resident of Zahramay Falls with green eyes and purple hair, who is Princess Samira's rival and wishes to replace her as the most powerful person in Zahramay Falls. Zeta is a sorceress instead of a genie, as she has no desire to grant the wishes of others, relying on magic potions and magical items. Her plans are almost always thwarted by Shimmer, Shine, and Leah. However, her own arrogance and ignorance can cause her to foil her own schemes as well. Despite the trouble she causes, the girls and Zac do not hold it against her and generally try to be friendly towards her when not foiling her schemes. Though she tends to be antagonistic towards Leah and her genies, she can be civil towards them at times and even work with them such when she finds herself and/or Nazboo in danger usually when her schemes backfire, which usually results in them saving her. Before becoming a sorceress, she was a genie-in-training under Empress Caliana along with Samira, whom Zeta befriended when she was a new student, though later quit school due to her jealousy of Samira and decided to become a sorceress instead, though despite her current rivalry with Samira is shown to cherish their past friendship as she held onto a feather pen Samira gave her when they first met along with a picture of the two of them together when they were both still friends.
Kaz (voiced by Jet Jurgensmeyer in the US, and Harrison Noble in the UK) is a genie in training with blue eyes and magenta hair who becomes Zac's genie in the second season. In contrast to Zac's easy-going and adventurous personality, Kaz is more cautious and scared easily. Despite their contrasting personalities, Zac and Kaz work well together and can be brave when he has to be. His cautious nature also means he puts more thought into how he grants Zac's wishes. Like most genies in Zahramay Falls, he has his own magic carpet, though sometimes uses Zac's Super Zoom Flyer, a magic carpet wished up by Zac. Kaz has a pet Ziffilon named Zain, who summoned by one of Zac's wishes after he learned that Kaz always wanted a Ziffilon as a pet. Though he and Zac get along well, he occasionally becomes unenthusiastic when granting wishes for Zac he would prefer not too. He was initially afraid of Zac's dog Rocket due to being unfamiliar with dogs, though eventually overcame his fear after Zac and the girls reminded him of how other genies were initially scared of Zain before they got to know him.
Empress Caliana (voiced by Barbara Eden) is Princess Samira's famous, semi-retired mentor with purple eyes and blonde hair with pink tips. Caliana was the one who gave Samira her special necklace back when she was a little genie-in-training. Empress Caliana was a great explorer when she was a little girl and made many groundbreaking discoveries, such as finding the Caliana Caves. She is also old friends with Rohan, the normally shy crystalline golem that guards the caves. When Zeta and Samira were younger, Caliana taught genies-in-training at her school in Genie Hall, where Zeta was her top student. While praising Zeta's potion making skills, she tried to teach her to be more considerate of others and assigned Samira to sit next to Zeta when Samira was a new student which lead to Samira befriending Zeta, though Zeta eventually became jealous of Samira when she became the class's new top student, which eventually led Zeta to quit school and decide to become a Sorceress instead after her attempt to sabotage Samira backfired, though Caliana expressed hope to Samira that she would one day return. 
Captain Zora (voiced by Kellie Pickler from the season two finale, Kate Higgins from seasons three to four) is a pirate genie who is Shine's idol. She is absentminded at times and can be very clumsy and forgetful, especially when she is on an adventure. She owns a flying pirate ship that she sometimes accidentally docks in odd places. Shine loves pirate genies and Captain Zora is her favorite of them all, so she gets very nervous and sometimes cannot talk clearly when she is around Zora.
Layla (voiced by Danica McKellar) is an ice genie who is a good friend of Princess Samira. She possesses an ice gem necklace that gives her freezing powers and keeps her body cold. She originally lived in a genie bottle buried on a sandy beach in Zahramay Falls, but it was accidentally broken by Leah and her genies. She currently lives in an ice palace.
Shaya (voiced by Kin Santiago in Season 2 through 3 and Hudson West) is a lightning genie in training who rides around on a flying cloud-board and can generate magical lightning. Leah and her genies help him catch a run away magic lightning bolt he created while practicing his magic. Though he is reluctant to work with Leah and her genies at first, he eventually learns the value of teamwork from them.
Nila (voiced by Mila Brener in the US, and Kimani Arthur in the UK) is a mermaid who lives in the waters near Zahramay Falls. Leah and her genies befriend Nila after Leah wishes to find a Mermaid after learning they are real. She helps the girls obtain the Mermaid Gem to change the girls back to their non-mermaid selves after Leah accidentally uses up her wishes which leaves the girls trapped in Mermaid form. After Nila and the girls obtain the gem by befriending its lonely Guardian, she teaches them the spell to activate the gem's power which can both transform into Mermaids as well as undo the transformation allowing the girls to visit Nila and go on underwater adventures with her. 
Imma (voiced by Grace Kaufman) is the Waterfall Genie who oversees the source of the rainbow waterfalls of Zahramay Falls in Rainbow Zahramay. The girls befriend her after Samira sends them on their first adventure to Rainbow Zahramay to investigate the cause of a weird mist produced by the falls that disrupts magic in Zahramay Falls and help Imma resolve the problem. Imma can use water magic that allows her to manipulate water using her magic staff which she also uses to activate the locks that control the flow of rainbow water to the falls.
 Wishy Washy Genie (voiced by Fred Tatasciore) is a male genie whose powerful magic is to remove or fix a wish that cannot be used on other genies. He can be very wishy washy, just like his name. But while on their adventure to find his home, the children help him make decisions.
Ayla (voiced by Liliana Mumy) is a hair-changing genie who has the power to change hairstyles.
Minu (voiced by Kitana Turnbull) is a flitter genie.
Afina (voiced by Julie Nathanson) is the Glitter Genie who lives in a glittery palace on a cloud in Rainbow Zarahmay.
Princess Ula (voiced by Tatyana Ali) is the ruler of Rainbow Zarahmay. She is also the Gem Princess in charge of giving all the Genie Gems their magic.
Nadia (voiced by Brittany Snow in Season 3 and Lana McKissack in Season 4) is the Dream Genie who is the only genie capable of granting wishes involving dreams and specializes in dream magic which involve using magic dust. She is also in charge of crafting special dreams for everyone in Zahramay Falls. As a result, she knows about everyone in Zahramay Falls. However it is rare for her to make dreams actually come true. 
Ezri (voiced by Gunnar Sizemore) is Nadia's assistant who like Nadia knows about everybody in Zahramay Falls as he recognizes Leah, Shimmer, Shine, and even Zeta on first meeting them.
Misha (voiced by Jewel in Season 3 and Kailey Snider in Season 4) – The Animal Genie who helps all the genies in Zarahmay Falls find their pets.
Princess Adara (voiced by Tania Gunadi) is the beautiful stardust princess of Zarahmay Skies.
Rubi (voiced by Luna Bella) is the Rainbow Genie of Zarahmay Skies.
Shaun (voiced by Ramone Hamilton) is Shaya's twin brother who's a cloud genie.

Animals
All animals in the series are voiced by Dee Bradley Baker.
Tala is Shimmer's pet gibbon monkey. She has green eyes, green jewels, and wears white pearls, like Shimmer does. Tala is shown to be a talented dancer.
Nahal is Shine's white and purple Bengal tiger cub. She has blue eyes, wears pink jewels, and a gold circlet, like Shine does. She has a talent for playing the keyboard.
Rocket is Zac's pet beagle who appears in several episodes of the first season and reappears in the third season. He did not appear in the entire season two. He is a rambunctious dog with a tendency to drool and chew on things which often causes trouble, though is simply an overly playful pouch who means no real harm. He has encountered Shimmer, Shine, Tala, and Nahal at various times. The only first pet native to Leah and Zac's world, he eventually is wished to Zahramay Falls by Zac though is mistakenly seen as a monster by genies like Kaz and animals native to genie world like Zain who is unfamiliar with dogs at first due to dogs not being native to their world, with the exception of Shimmer, Shine, Tala, Nahal, and Samira. After helping Zac stop Zeta from stealing Samira's staff, Samira permits Rocket to accompany Zac when he visits Zahramay Falls. 
Nazboo is Zeta's talking pet dragon, who caters to her every need and acts as Zeta's underling. He has teal scales, purple eyes, white horns, a white stomach, and blue toes. He is somewhat clumsy and often accidentally causes Zeta's schemes to backfire. He can also get easily distracted by food or anything that piques his interest. He also enjoys getting an occasional tummy rub from Zeta. Though he acts as Zeta's underling most of the time, he is friendly towards Leah, Zac, and their genies as well as their pets to the point he often greets them by saying "Hi, Friends!" even in the middle of one of Zeta's schemes. Unlike Zeta, he is generally more considerate of others and prefers to play fair in competitions though usually assists Zeta in cheating. In the third season, he is revealed to be from Manetikar, The Land of Dragons and befriended Zeta when she came to Manetikar to find a dragon for a pet. Feeling sorry for Zeta after her attempt to make one of the larger flying dragons her pet failed, he agreed to become her pet and went home with her to her lair in Zahramay Falls, where he has lived ever since. He has a sister and two brothers who resemble him in appearance and personality.
Roya is Princess Samira's pet peacock, who resides in her palace. Roya is the polar opposite of Shimmer and Shine's pets, as she would much rather show off her feathers or practice walking gracefully than play or dance. Unlike Samira, Roya has a strong dislike for Zeta and Nazboo, to the point of literally chasing them out of Samira's Palace on one occasion. Once a year, she sheds a special feather with the ability to repair any magical object. 
Parisa is Leah's pet fox who possesses the ability to camouflage herself, making her practically invisible, whenever she wants, she also has a talent for painting. She is the second pet native to Leah and Zac’s world overall. Parisa is introduced midway through the second season. Like Kaz and Zain, she was initially scared of Rocket, due to being unfamiliar with dogs, though not to the same degree that Kaz and Zain were.
Zain is Kaz's pet Ziffilon (a griffin-like creature). Kaz had always wanted a pet Ziffilon before getting Zain, so Zac uses one of his wishes to wish up a Ziffilon for Kaz. Zain is by far the largest of the pets, as he is big enough for Kaz to ride on his back, though despite his size Zain gets scared easily even more so than Kaz. Like most Ziffilons his favorite food is Zlam Berries and is originally from Ziffilon Island. Though he gets along with the other pets, he is frightened by Rocket at first due to being unfamiliar with dogs though after Zac reminds Kaz and Zain how other genies were scared of Zain at first, he and Kaz manage to overcome their initial fear of Rocket. 
Zoomicorns are winged Unicorns native to Zahramay Falls and Rainbow Zahramay introduced in the second season. They are friendly and helpful creatures who occasionally aid the girls and allow them to ride them. There is also a game called Zoomicorn Toss, where players ride flying Zahramay Cloud Boards while trying to throw rings around a Zoomicorn's horn as it flies around, without the use of magic as using magic is considered unfair. The only known named Zoomicorn, is Gleam who lives in Rainbow Zahramay that is a friend of the Glitter Genie Afina whom the girls meet and befriend during one of their adventures in Rainbow Zahramay in the third season. 
Scallywag is the magical pet of the Pirate Genie Captain Zora, who helps Zora remember things that she forgets such as names and the meaning of words and phrases used by pirates. Scallywag flies around by spinning her tail in helicopter like fashion. Her magic goes out of control when scared, causing random magic effects. 
Nazboo's Family are Nazboo's three siblings Razboo, Kazboo, and Frank who are introduced in the third season. They are all small flightless dragons that resemble Nazboo in appearance and share his friendly, playful nature as well as his love of food and tummy rubs. Nazboo and his siblings tend to get into trouble when they are together, much to Zeta's frustration and annoyance. Nazboo's sister Razboo has purple scales and wears a dark pink bow on her head. His brother Kazboo has dark green scales and a purple mohawk, while his brother Frank has blue scales and wears a light pink bowtie. Like their brother, Razboo, Kazboo, and Frank all have purple eyes, blue toes, and white bellies and horns. While Kazboo and Razboo are capable of speech like Nazboo, Frank's vocabulary is apparently limited to saying his own name, which does not rhyme with his other siblings' names.
Gleam is a blue glitter Zoomicorn native Rainbow Zahramay.
Lulu is Misha's pet Panda.
Zahrora, Zoomdust, and Zadazzle are three Zahracorns. Shimmer's one is Zahrora, Shine's one Zoomdust and Leah's one Zadazzle.
Dahliza is Princess Adara's Zahracorn.
Fuzzle Whuzzles are little creatures in Rainbow Zarahmay.
Azah is Rubi's Zahracorn.

Production
Shimmer and Shine is based on an unreleased pilot that took six months to develop in 2013, with a reported completion date of September 2013. The pilot was created by Farnaz Esnaashari-Charmatz, who previously worked on Dora the Explorer, with Sindy Boveda Spackman as the writer and Andy Bialk as the art director. It was ordered to series by Nickelodeon in March 2014, with the first season to consist of 20 episodes. The series premiered on August 24, 2015.

On February 11, 2016, it was announced that Shimmer and Shine was renewed for a 20-episode second season that uses CGI animation, with the second season premiering in the United States on June 15, 2016. On June 21, 2016, Shimmer and Shine was renewed for a third season of an additional 20 episodes. The third season premiered on May 5, 2017.

On May 24, 2017, Shimmer and Shine was renewed for a fourth season consisting of 20 episodes. The fourth season premiered October 20, 2018. Season 4 was eventually increased to 26 episodes.

Broadcast
Shimmer and Shine premiered on Nick Jr. UK on 9 November 2015, where it was dubbed with British voice actors, replacing the original American soundtrack (though Zeta and the animals' voices remained unchanged).

Merchandise

Books
Nickelodeon and Random House Children's Books released books based on the show starting in January 2016.

DVDs
Nickelodeon, with Paramount for Region 1 and with Universal / Sony for Region 4, have released a number of DVDs based on the show.

Nickelodeon, with Paramount for Region 1 and with Universal / Sony for Region 4, released a number of DVDs featuring one episode from a variety of the animated television series they have produced, including "Shimmer & Shine", "Blaze and the Monster Machines", "Blue’s Clues", "Bubble Guppies", "Dora and Friends: Into the City!", "The Fresh Beat Band of Spies", "Paw Patrol", "Rusty Rivets", "Sunny Day", "Top Wing" and "Wallykazam!", on average 6 on each DVD.

Shimmer and Shine episodes featured as bonus episodes in the DVD releases of other animated television series that Nickelodeon produced, primarily with Universal / Sony for Region 4, including "Paw Patrol" and "Nella the Princess Knight"

Toys
Nickelodeon and Fisher-Price released a toy line based on the show. Mega Bloks playlets based on the show have been released.

See also 
 Guru Studio

References

External links
 
 
 Shimmer and Shine at NickAnimationStudio.com

2010s American animated television series
2020s American animated television series
2010s Nickelodeon original programming
2020s Nickelodeon original programming
2015 American television series debuts
2020 American television series endings
American children's animated adventure television series
American children's animated fantasy television series
American children's animated supernatural television series
American computer-animated television series
English-language television shows
American flash animated television series
American preschool education television series
Nick Jr. original programming
Animated television series about children

Children's television characters
Fantasy television characters
Female characters in animation
Fictional anthropomorphic characters
Fictional characters who can teleport
Fictional characters who use magic
Fictional genies
Fictional goddesses
Fictional telekinetics
Folklore characters
Genies in television
Television duos
Television sidekicks
Animated television series about twins
Magical girl television series